José Macpherson y Hemas (1839–1902) was a Spanish amateur geologist, noted as pioneer in the introduction of modern techniques for the studies of rocks in Spain.

Born in 1839 in Cádiz in a family of traders, son to a Scottish father and a mother from Cádiz. Macpherson met Francisco Giner de los Ríos (the founder of the Institución Libre de Enseñanza, ILE) for the first time in 1875, collaborating with and eventually becoming a lecturer of the ILE (1882).

Macpherson died on 11 October 1902 in La Granja.

References 
Citations

Bibliography
 
 

Spanish geologists
1839 births
1902 deaths
Spanish people of Scottish descent
People from Cádiz